The 2016–17 Georgia Southern Eagles men's basketball team represented Georgia Southern University during the 2016–17 NCAA Division I men's basketball season. The Eagles, led by fourth-year head coach Mark Byington, played their home games at Hanner Fieldhouse in Statesboro, Georgia as members of the Sun Belt Conference. They finished the season 18–18, 11–7 in Sun Belt play to finish in a three-way tie for third place. They lost in the quarterfinals of the Sun Belt tournament to Troy. They were invited to the College Basketball Invitational where they lost in the first round to Utah Valley.

Previous season
The Eagles finished the 2015–16 season 14–17, 10–10 in Sun Belt play to finish in fifth place. They lost in the first round of the Sun Belt tournament to South Alabama.

Roster

Schedule and results

|-
!colspan=9 style=| Exhibition

|-
!colspan=9 style=| Non-conference regular season

|-
!colspan=9 style=| Sun Belt Conference regular season

|-
!colspan=9 style=| Sun Belt tournament

|-
!colspan=9 style=| CBI

References

Georgia Southern Eagles men's basketball seasons
Georgia Southern
Georgia Southern